USS Atlanta was a protected cruiser and one of the first steel warships of the "New Navy" of the 1880s.

Atlanta was laid down on 8 November 1883 at Chester, Pennsylvania by Delaware River Iron Ship Building and Engine Works; launched on 9 October 1884; sponsored by Miss Jessie Lincoln, the daughter of Secretary of War Robert Todd Lincoln and granddaughter of President Abraham Lincoln; and commissioned at the New York Navy Yard on 19 July 1886, Captain Francis M. Bunce in command.

Design and construction

All were ordered from the same shipyard, John Roach & Sons of Chester, Pennsylvania. However, when Secretary of the Navy William C. Whitney initially refused to accept Dolphin, claiming her design was defective, the Roach yard went bankrupt and Atlanta was completed at the New York Navy Yard, which had little experience with steel-hulled ships.

As-built armament included two /30 caliber Mark 1 guns, six /30 caliber Mark 2 guns, two 6-pounder rapid fire guns, two 3-pounder Hotchkiss revolving cannon, two 1-pounder Hotchkiss revolving cannon, and two .45 caliber (11.4 mm) Gatling guns. The 8-inch guns were initially in open barbettes with gun shields added later.

Armor protection was light, with 2-inch (50.8 mm) gun shields and conning tower, and a 1.5-inch (38.1 mm) deck extending  over the machinery spaces.

The as-built engineering plant included eight coal-fired cylindrical fire-tube boilers producing  steam and a horizontal compound engine producing  driving one shaft. Like the other "ABCD" ships, Atlanta was built with a sail rig to increase cruising range, though it was later removed.

Refit

Service history

Atlanta remained at New York fitting out and undergoing modifications until July 1887, when she joined the North Atlantic Squadron. For a little over two years, she cruised the Atlantic coast, the Gulf of Mexico, and the West Indies. On 30 September 1889, she was reassigned to the Squadron of Evolution with which she voyaged to Europe and the Mediterranean that winter. On the return voyage the protected cruiser paid a friendship visit to the Republic of Brazil before returning to New York at the end of July 1890. There, she resumed duty along the east coast and in the West Indies. Between February and April 1891, she cruised the Gulf of Mexico. From May–October, the ship operated along the Atlantic coast and participated in exercises and maneuvers at Boston and New York, training members of the Naval Militia. Between October 1891 and July 1892, she served successively along the east coast, in the West Indies, and in South American waters.

On 2 September 1892, the cruiser was transferred from the Squadron of Evolution back to the North Atlantic Squadron. Between December 1892 and February 1893, she operated in the West Indies protecting American interests. From March–May, the warship participated in the Naval Review held at Hampton Roads, Virginia. In May–June, she returned to the Gulf of Mexico. On 18 July 1893, Atlanta was placed out of commission at Norfolk, Virginia. There, she remained until recommissioned on 2 April 1894. She returned to duty on the North Atlantic station for the next 17 months. During that assignment, she put a landing party ashore at Boca del Toro, Colombia, on 8 March 1895 to protect American lives and property threatened by a Liberal Party revolt and the activity of filibusters. In September 1895, she was placed out of commission at the New York Navy Yard where she was laid up for the next five years.

On 15 September 1900, she was placed back in commission at New York, Comdr. E. C. Pendleton in command. Late in October, the ship put to sea to join the South Atlantic Squadron off the coast of Brazil. She cruised those waters until November 1902 when she was transferred to the Caribbean Squadron. During the latter tour of duty, she again landed shore parties to protect American interests; first at Santo Domingo in April 1903 and then at Porto Bello, Panama, the following December. She made a voyage to the Mediterranean in 1904 and returned in October, via the western coast of Africa and Cape Town, to the South Atlantic station. She arrived back at Hampton Roads on 26 December and, in January 1905, moved to Annapolis, Maryland, where she was placed in reserve on 12 January. Atlanta remained inactive only until 8 May, at which time she was returned to full commission for service in the Coast Squadron to participate in midshipman training missions. In November 1905, the warship moved to Norfolk where she served as a barracks ship for sailors of the Torpedo Flotilla until 1909. At that time, she moved to Charleston, South Carolina, where she resumed duty as a barracks ship. On 23 March 1912, Atlanta was relieved of duty, and on 24 April her name was struck from the Navy List. The ship was sold at Charleston on 10 June to Frank Rijsdyk's  (ship scrapping yard).

References

Bibliography
 
 
 
 
 Rentfrow, James C. Home Squadron: The U.S. Navy on the North Atlantic Station. Annapolis, Maryland: Naval Institute Press, 2014.  
 Spears, John Randolph. A History of the United States Navy. New York: C. Scribner's Sons, 1908. 
 The White Squadron. Toledo, Ohio: Woolson Spice Co., 1891. 
 The White Squadron: Armed Cruisers, U.S.N. New York: International Art Publ. Co, 1800. 
 The White Squadron of the U S Navy. New York: James Clarke Publisher, 1894.

External links

Photo gallery of USS Atlanta at NavSource.org
Letterbook of the U.S.S. Atlanta, 1889-1893, MS 106 held by Special Collections & Archives, Nimitz Library at the United States Naval Academy

1884 ships
Ships built by the Delaware River Iron Ship Building and Engine Works
Protected cruisers of the United States Navy